L'expédition is an album by Les Cowboys Fringants. It was released in September 2008 and reached the number one spot on the Quebec music charts.

Track listing
"Droit devant" – 4:45
"Chêne et roseau" – 2:12
"Entre deux taxis" – 3:32
"La Catherine" – 3:03
"Histoire de pêche" – 3:09
"Bobo" – 3:37
"Rue des souvenirs" – 2:50
"Monsieur" – 3:54
"La tête haute" – 4:32
"Les hirondelles" – 4:33
"Tant qu'on aura de l'amour" – 2:45
"La bonne pomme" – 3:29
"Train de vie" – 2:47
"Une autre journée qui se lève" – 5:33

Charts

References

External links 
https://web.archive.org/web/20081004212202/http://www.cowboysfringants.com/nouvelles.shtml
https://web.archive.org/web/20081001192441/http://www.cowboysfringants.com/discographie.shtml

Les Cowboys Fringants albums
2008 albums